Joseph Andrew Scudero (July 2, 1930 – September 11, 2019) is a former American football safety in the National Football League for the Washington Redskins and Pittsburgh Steelers. He also played one season in Canada, with the Toronto Argonauts, where he was an all-star. He was born in San Francisco, California, and played college football at the University of San Francisco.

References 

1930 births
2019 deaths
Players of American football from San Francisco
American football safeties
Washington Redskins players
Pittsburgh Steelers players
Toronto Argonauts players
Eastern Conference Pro Bowl players
San Francisco Dons football players